Capua thelmae is a species of moth of the family Tortricidae. It is found on Mindanao island in the Philippines.

References

External links
 
 

Moths described in 1968
Capua (moth)